Miyako Yoshida  (吉田都, born 28 October 1965) is a Japanese ballet dancer. She was a Principal Guest Artist of The Royal Ballet as well as a principal dancer with K-ballet, Japan.

Life and career
Born and trained in Tokyo, Yoshida won the Prix de Lausanne in 1983 and joined Royal Ballet School in England. In 1984, she joined then Sadler's Wells Royal Ballet, the present Birmingham Royal Ballet and was promoted to principal in 1988.  In following year, she was awarded the Global Award and the Arts Encouragement Prize for Artists of the Ministry of Education, Science, Sports and Culture, Japan.

In 1995, Yoshida joined The Royal Ballet as principal dancer and was known for her partnership with such as Tetsuya Kumakawa, and Irek Mukhamedov.  She was also appointed UNESCO Artist for Peace in 2001.  In 2004, she married Takashi Endo, a Japanese football agent.

In 2006, she joined K-ballet while she continued dancing with The Royal Ballet, before winning the Best Female Dancer in National Dance Awards.  In 2007, she was appointed an Honorary Officer of the Order of the British Empire (OBE) for services to dance. In 2010 she retired from the Royal Ballet at Covent Garden.

Career and repertory 
Odette/Odile (Swan Lake), Aurora, Juliet (Romeo and Juliet (Prokofiev)), Lise, Giselle (Giselle), Swanilda (Coppélia), Sugar Plum Fairy (The Nutcracker), Kitri (Don Quixote), Cinderella, Ondine, Chloë, Titania, Tchaikovsky pas de deux, 'Le Corsaire pas de deux, Homage to the Queen and leading roles in Prince of the Pagodas, Symphonic Variations, Elite Syncopations, Snow Queen, Galanteries, Fin du jour, Symphony in C, Birthday Offering, The Firebird, Scènes de ballet, Les Rendezvous and Rhapsody.

At the 2006 National Dance Awards, she was the Best female dancer.

References

External links
 
 
 
 

Prima ballerinas
People educated at the Royal Ballet School
Principal dancers of The Royal Ballet
Birmingham Royal Ballet dancers
Japanese ballerinas
English ballerinas
1965 births
Living people
Prix de Lausanne winners
Honorary Officers of the Order of the British Empire
Japanese expatriates in the United Kingdom
20th-century ballet dancers
21st-century ballet dancers
People from Tokyo
People from Tokyo Metropolis